Clare, officially named the Municipality of the District of Clare, is a district municipality  in western Nova Scotia, Canada. Statistics Canada classifies the district municipality as a municipal district.

Geography
The Municipality of the District of Clare occupies the western half of Digby County.  Most of the municipality's settled areas are located along St. Marys Bay, a sub-basin of the Gulf of Maine.

History
The township was settled in 1768 by Acadian families who had returned to Nova Scotia from exile.
Prior to the establishment of Clare the Mi'kmaw knew the area as Wagweiik. The mouth of Salmon River is thought to be a traditional summer settlement of the Mi'kmaw and several artifacts have been found there, as well as at Meteghan, Major's Point and other sites [2]. Place names like Hectanooga, Mitihikan (Meteghan), and Chicaben (Church Point) are found in the area. They also had a principal settlement by River Allen near Cape Sainte-Marie used for fishing and as a canoe route [3]. The Mi'kmaw also used a fishing weir system for catching mackerel and herring that they taught to the new settlers, which they continued to use until well into the 1900s, and fish drying techniques that continue today. They also caught eels, seals, clams, urchins and other sea life, as well as berries, medicinal plants and other coastal resources. As new settlers arrived in the 1760s–1780s, the Mi'kmaw were instrumental in helping the new Acadians survive and become skilled in surviving the harsh winters along the coast. By the 1800s most Mi'kmaw had left the area to live on the Reserve in Bear River, while still returning for fishing, hunting, trade and ceremony throughout the year.  
It was named "Clare" by then Lieutenant Governor of Nova Scotia, Michael Francklin. The name comes from the County Clare in Ireland.

Present day
The municipality is inhabited by many Acadians and their descendants and conducts its business in both English and French, although the official language is English and both languages are used. The only French university in the province of Nova Scotia, Université Sainte-Anne, is located in Church Point (Pointe-de-l'Église / Chicoben) and 47% of the adult population has a postsecondary education. The area hosts the oldest and largest annual Acadian Festival, as well as Nova Scotia's first Gran Fondo cycling event, which was cancelled in 2020 due to COVID-19.

Demographics 

Communities

Access routes
Highways and numbered routes that run through the district municipality, including external routes that start or finish at the municipal boundary:

Highways

Trunk Routes

Collector Routes:

External Routes:
None

Culture
Musical groups from the area include:
 Grand Dérangement
 Blou
 Radio Radio
 BeauPhare
 DPS
 Sweet Tuesday
 Cy

The song M'en allant par Saulnierville Station written by Denis Comeau and recorded by Suroît is a song about the local community of Saulnierville Station.

Musicians from the area include:
 P'tit Belliveau
 Arthur Comeau
 Johnny Comeau
 Jacobus
 Marc à Paul à Jos
 Kenneth Saulnier
 Micaela Comeau [Just Micci]

Filmmaker:
 Phil Comeau

See also
 List of municipalities in Nova Scotia

References

External links

Communities in Digby County, Nova Scotia
Clare
Acadia